The Treaty of Ahmet Pasha (Persian:عهدنامه احمد پاشا) was a treaty signed on 10 January 1732 between the Ottoman Empire and Safavid Persia.

Background 
In the 17th century, a stalemate between the Ottoman and Safavid empires had been reached by the treaties of Serav and Zuhab. However, during the short rule of Afghanistan based Hotaki dynasty, chaos  in Iran resulted in clashes along frontiers, especially in Caucasus. Meanwhile, Peter I of Russia began to occupy the Iranian territories in the North Caucasus and Transcaucasia, gains which were confirmed by the Treaty of Saint Petersburg (1723). Fearing a Russian-controlled Caucasus, the Ottomans decided to capture Tbilisi to balance the Russian advance. But this operation resulted in a long Ottoman Safavid war.

War 
Between 1723 and 1730, the Ottomans were able to control South Caucasus by capturing Yerevan and Ganja in addition to Tbilisi. In the southern fronts (i.e., Western Iran), Ottomans captured Tabriz, Urmia, Khorramabad, Kermanshah and Hamedān. In 1724, the Ottomans and Russians had agreed, by the Treaty of Constantinople (1724), to further divide the aforementioned Iranian territories between the two of them. But after Tahmasp II of Safavids began controlling Iran, the Ottoman advance was checked. Tired of war, both sides decided to end the war. Ahmet Pasha (Ottoman) and  Mehmet Rıza Kulu (Persian) signed the treaty.

Terms of treaty
The terms of the treaty were:
 Ottoman Empire kept its gains in Caucasus,
 Ottoman gains in West Iran (except Hamadan, and Kermanshah) were conceded to Persia, and
 Aras River became the new border line in South Caucasus.

Aftermath 
The treaty proved to be an armistice rather than a permanent treaty. Because, neither Ottoman sultan Mahmut I approved the loss of Tabriz (needs explanation, see Hamadan above) nor Nader Shah, then the commander in chief of the Persian army, the losses in Caucasus. During Nader Shah's reign, Afsharid Persia was able to regain its losses.

See also 
Ottoman Persian Wars
Treaty of Kerden
Treaty of Constantinople (1724)

References

Sources
 

1732 in Asia
1732 in Europe
1732 in law
1732 treaties
Ahmet Pasha
Ahmet Pasha
History of Tabriz
History of Hamadan Province
History of the Caucasus
1732 in the Ottoman Empire
1732 in Iran
Ottoman–Persian Wars